Alex Tinming Lee (born July 11, 1995) is an American politician who has served as a member of the California State Assembly since 2020, having represented the 24th district since 2022 and the 25th district from 2020 to 2022. A member of the Democratic Party, Lee's district includes Fremont, Newark, Sunol, Milpitas, and parts of western San Jose.

Early life, education, and career
Lee was born on July 11, 1995, in San Jose, California. His parents immigrated to the United States from Hong Kong. His father is an engineer and his mother is a nurse. After his parents divorced, Lee lived alternately with his father in Milpitas and his mother in North San Jose.

Lee graduated from Milpitas High School in 2013. He became interested in filmmaking and eventually decided to pursue a dual degree in political science and communications at the University of California, Davis. Lee ran for a seat on the student senate at UC Davis in 2014 and served as student body president in 2016. He graduated with a bachelor of arts in 2017.

While attending college, Lee was an intern for several politicians including Mike Honda, Ed Chau, Evan Low, Cecilia Aguiar-Curry, and Kansen Chu. He began working for Henry Stern as a full-time legislative aide after graduating college. Prior to running for office, Lee delivered food, and lived with his mother due to the high cost of living in his district.

California State Assembly

Tenure 
In June 2019, Lee announced he would run to succeed Chu in the 25th district upon Chu's retirement from the State Assembly. He ran as a democratic socialist and was endorsed by the Democratic Socialists of America. In March 2020, Lee finished second in a field of nine candidates in the nonpartisan blanket primary; he split the vote with seven other Democrats and finished behind Republican Bob Brunton. Lee defeated Brunton in the general election.

Lee was sworn into the State Assembly on December 7, 2020. Taking office at age 25, he was the Assembly's youngest member, the first born in the 1990s, and the first openly bisexual member.

On his first day in office, Lee introduced a bill that would ban corporate donations to political candidates. Lee has since introduced legislation in favor of increasing social housing in California. He has also secured $2.5 million in funding for bicycle infrastructure and services for unhoused people in Milpitas.

In 2022, Lee was redrawn into the 24th district. He placed first in the nonpartisan blanket primary ahead of Brunton, Chu, and two other Democrats, and defeated Brunton in a rematch in the general election. He was sworn into his second term on December 5, 2022.

Electoral history

References

External links

1995 births
Living people
21st-century American politicians
California politicians of Chinese descent
University of California, Davis alumni
Democratic Party members of the California State Assembly
California socialists
American democratic socialists
Bisexual politicians
LGBT state legislators in California
American LGBT people of Asian descent
American politicians of Hong Kong descent
People from Milpitas, California
Politicians from San Jose, California
Bisexual men
21st-century LGBT people